Queensborough Community College (QCC) is a community college in Bayside, Queens, New York. One of seven community colleges within the City University of New York (CUNY) system, Queensborough enrolls more than 12,000 students and more than 770 Instructional Faculty.

Queensborough opened in 1959 as a campus of the State University of New York and in 1965 transferred to CUNY. Its mission is to prepare students to transfer to a four-year institution or enter the work force. The college offers more than 40 associate's degree programs as well as certificate and continuing education programs. Queensborough is regionally accredited by the Middle States Association of Colleges and Schools.

Campus

Queensborough's 37-acre campus was constructed on the site of the former Oakland Country Club golf course. It comprises ten major buildings used for instruction and extracurricular activities. Among them are the Kupferberg Holocaust Resource Center and Archives, Queensborough Performing Arts Center, the QCC Art Gallery, and an astronomy observatory.

Academics 
Queensborough offers the following degrees:
Associate in Arts (AA) 
Associate in Science (AS) 
Associate in Applied Science (AAS)
Professional Certificate

Transfer curricula are designed for students who plan to continue their studies at a four-year college or professional school. These curricula are equivalent to the first two years of study at a senior college.

Career curricula combine preparation for a career with a grounding in general education, with many graduates entering jobs in business, health sciences, industry, or government. Although career curricula are not primarily designed to prepare students for transfer to senior institutions, many career graduates decide to continue their studies and earn the baccalaureate.

Cultural institutions
The Kupferberg Holocaust Center houses books, documents (including nearly 400 doctoral dissertations on microfilm), and audio-visual materials for use by students, teachers, scholars and any other interested persons. 
The Queensborough Performing Arts Center (QPAC) was founded in 1963 and seats more than 1,000 people. 
The QCC Art Gallery was founded in 1966 by the first chairman of Queensborough Department of Art and Photography, Priva B. Gross. In 1981, the Art Gallery opened in its present location - historic 1920s Oakland Building, former club house for the Oakland Country Club and the oldest building on campus. The Art Gallery was renovated again in 2004.

Publications
Communiqué, the campus newspaper, is published monthly during the fall and spring semesters by the students in Introduction to Journalism. 
The literary magazine of Queensborough Community College publishes stories and poems submitted by students.

Athletics
Queensborough Community College teams participate as a member of the National Junior College Athletic Association (NJCAA). The Tigers are a member of the community college section of the City University of New York Athletic Conference (CUNYAC). Men's sports include baseball, basketball, cross country, soccer, swimming and track & field; women's sports include basketball, cross country, swimming, track & field and volleyball.

Notable alumni
Joe Santagato, YouTuber and entertainer
J.Sheon, Taiwanese rapper

References

External links
 
 Official athletics website
 City University of New York

 
Bayside, Queens
Colleges of the City University of New York
Community colleges in New York City
Educational institutions established in 1959
Two-year colleges in the United States
Universities and colleges in Queens, New York
NJCAA athletics
Universities and colleges on Long Island
Universities and colleges in New York City
1959 establishments in New York City